Lea Antonoplis (born January 20, 1959) is a former professional tennis player from the U.S. who won the Wimbledon Girls' Singles in 1977 and four WTA doubles titles.

Early life
Antonoplis attended Glendora High School from 1974 to 1977 and graduated from the University of Southern California.

Tennis career
In 1974, Lea played an exhibition match arranged by Dale Jensen in Claremont, Ca with Tracy Austin, Lawrence McCutcheon, and Elgin Baylor.

Also in 1974, Antonoplis played in her first Grand Slam match at the US Open, losing to Sue Mappin in three sets. In the 1977 Wimbledon Championships, Antonoplis won the junior singles, beating compatriot Peanut Louie-Harper in the final in straight sets.
In 1979, she won her first WTA doubles title in the Player's Canadian Open with Diane Evers, defeating Chris O'Neil and Mimmi Wikstedt 2–6, 6–1, 6–3. In 1983, she won two doubles titles with Barbara Jordan. In Indianapolis, they beat Rosalyn Fairbank and Candy Reynolds 5–7, 6–4, 7–5 in the final, and in Hershey, they beat Sherry Acker and Ann Henricksson 6–3, 6–4. In 1986, she won her fourth and last WTA doubles title with Barbara Gerken, beating Gigi Fernández and Susan Leo 6–1, 6–2 in the final.

Antonoplis also acquired some notability at a 1976 satellite tournament in South Orange, New Jersey when she won a three-set semifinal match against Renée Richards. This was the first tournament in which Richards competed after it was revealed that she had undergone a sex-change procedure.

WTA Tour finals

Doubles 10 (3–7)

References

External links
 
 

1959 births
Living people
People from West Covina, California
American female tennis players
Tennis people from California
USC Trojans women's tennis players
Wimbledon junior champions
Grand Slam (tennis) champions in girls' singles